Unknotting may refer to: 
Unknotting number, the minimum number of times the knot must be passed through itself to untie it
Unknotting problem, a mathematical problem